This article shows statistics of individual players for the football club F.C. Copenhagen. It also lists all matches that F.C. Copenhagen will play in the 2009–10 season.

Events

Players

Squad information
This section show the squad as currently, considering all players who are confirmedly moved in and out (see section Players in / out).

Squad stats

Starting 11 
This section shows the most used players for each position considering a 4-4-2 formation.

Players in / out

In

Out

Club

Coaching staff

Kit

|
|
|
|
|

Other information

Competitions

Overall

Danish Superliga

Classification

Results summary

Results by round

Matches

Competitive

Friendlies

References

External links
 F.C. Copenhagen official website

2009-10
Danish football clubs 2009–10 season